The World Group was the highest level of Fed Cup competition in 1999. Eight nations competed in a three-round knockout competition. Spain was the defending champion, but they were defeated in the first round by Italy. United States defeated Italy, and then Russia in the final to claim their 16th title.

Participating Teams

Draw

First round

Spain vs. Italy

Croatia vs. United States

France vs. Russia

Slovakia vs. Switzerland

Semifinals

Italy vs. United States

Russia vs. Slovakia

Final

United States vs. Russia

References

See also
Fed Cup structure

World Group